Nanci Bowen (born March 31, 1967, in Tifton, Georgia) is an American professional golfer. She attended the University of Georgia and her rookie season on the LPGA Tour was 1991. Her highlight victory on the Tour came at one of the major championships, the 1995 Nabisco Dinah Shore. As of 2015, Bowen is a teaching professional in Greenville, South Carolina.

Professional wins

LPGA Tour wins (1)

Futures Tour wins (3)
1990 Christa McAuliffe FUTURES Classic
1993 The Toledo Bend FUTURES Classic, Colony Creek FUTURES Classic

Major championships

Wins (1)

External links

American female golfers
Georgia Bulldogs women's golfers
LPGA Tour golfers
Winners of LPGA major golf championships
Golfers from Georgia (U.S. state)
People from Tifton, Georgia
1967 births
Living people